Bertāns (feminine: Bertāne) is a Latgalian language surname. Notable people with the surname include:
Dairis Bertāns (born 1989), Latvian basketball player
Dāvis Bertāns (born 1992), Latvian basketball player

Latgalian-language surnames